Labour Federation may refer to:

Labour Federation (Italy)
Labour Federation (Lithuania)